Rekavice is a village in the municipality of Banja Luka, Republika Srpska, Bosnia and Herzegovina.
Near the village, on the southern side of the steep slope of the Vrbas canyon. is strategically situated ruined medieval Bosnian castle of Zvečaj.

References

Villages in Republika Srpska
Populated places in Banja Luka